OCS, or previously known as Orange Cinéma Séries, is a group of French pay television networks dedicated to films and series owned and operated by Orange S.A.

The channels launched on November 13, 2008 as part of the company's new direct-to-home satellite service and was exclusive to Orange TV.

OCS is composed of three channels and a streaming service. OCS broadcast almost all their series in English with French subtitles in simulcast with the American broadcasting, but they also broadcast series dubbed in French or French series. From November 2008 to December 2022, OCS was holding the French rights to HBO production. 

Since 2012, OCS TV package is now available from Bouygues Telecom, CanalSat, Numericable, Orange TV, SFR and Tahiti Nui Satellite. All subscribers have the option to subscribe to OCS with their TV distributor. OCS is also available through multi devices.

History
On 25 November 2011, Canal+ took a 33% share in Orange Cinéma Séries. Originally exclusive to La TV d'Orange, Orange Cinéma Séries joined CanalSat on 5 April 2012. On 22 September 2012, Orange Cinéma Séries became OCS to show its expansion bouquets other than Orange TV.

On 10 October 2013, OCS Happy was merged with OCS Max ; OCS à la demande became the multiplatform service OCS Go ; and OCS Novo was replaced by OCS City, specialised in TV series and HBO productions.

Since 2008, OCS have an exclusive contract with HBO, but other channels like Canal+ Séries can broadcasts reruns of HBO series. In 2017, OCS's contract with HBO became stricter, giving complete exclusivity to OCS.

The suite also includes a streaming service, OCS Go, who simply became OCS in 2019. Content is provided by exclusive contracts with Warner Bros., HBO, MGM and Fidelity as well as non-exclusive contracts with Gaumont, SND, BAC and Wild Side.

On 2 August 2017, OCS was launched in Switzerland on Teleclub Premium. It is also available on the Ciné-Séries bouquet of Canal+ since March 2019.

In December 2022, OCS deal with HBO ended with HBO productions leaving OCS from January 2023 onwards. Following that, OCS closed OCS City, the channel that was in charge of HBO programs, and merged it with OCS Choc to create OCS Pulp.

On January 8, 2023, Canal+ Group has announced they're acquiring both OCS and its production house, Orange Studio, which Canal+ previously owned the minority stake on Orange's pay TV arm and film division.

TV channels

Defunct TV channels

Series

OCS Max
This list includes programs from OCS Happy who have been moved to OCS Max.

 2 Broke Girls
 3615 Monique
 Aïcha
 Alphonse Président
 Angry Birds Toons
 Band of Brothers 
 Being Erica (Les Vies rêvées d'Erica Strange)
 Better with You
 Black Sails
 Boardwalk Empire (season 1-4, other seasons on OCS City)
 La Bouse
 Breaking Bad (season 1-4, other seasons on OCS City)
 Bunheads
 Cougar Town
 Crash
 Éternelle
 Entourage 
 Falling Skies
 France Kbek
 Fantômette (2000)
 The Garfield Show (Garfield et Cie)
 Gary Unmarried (La Nouvelle Vie de Gary)
 The Girlfriend Experience
 Glee 
 Good Behavior
 The Handmaid's Tale (The Handmaid's Tale : La Servante écarlate)
 Hell on Wheels (Hell on Wheels : L'Enfer de l'Ouest, season 1-2, other seasons on OCS Choc)
 Holly Weed
 Houdini (Houdini, l’illusionniste)
 The Hour 
 How to Make It in America
 Hung
 In Treatment (En analyse)
 John Adams
 Kinky et Cosy
 Lazy Company
 Legion
 Luck
 Magic City 
 Make It or Break It (Championnes à tout prix)
 Merci Julie !
 Mildred Pierce
 Mr Selfridge
 Mr. Sunshine
 The No. 1 Ladies' Detective Agency (L'Agence N°1 des dames détectives)
 Pretty Little Liars 
 Quarry
 Q.I. (season 1-2)
 Rubicon
 Seinfeld
 Sex and the City
 Six Feet Under
 True Blood (season 1-6, other seasons on OCS City)
 Turn: Washington's Spies (Turn)
 Veep (season 1-2, other seasons on OCS City)
 War and Peace (2007, Guerre et Paix)
 The White Princess 
 The White Queen 
 Winx Club
 Zak

OCS Choc (2008-2023) 

 Ash vs Evil Dead
 Band of Brothers 
 The Fear (2012)
 Game of Thrones (Game of Thrones : Le Trône de fer, season 1-3, other seasons on OCS City)
 Generation Kill
 Hell on Wheels (Hell on Wheels : L'Enfer de l'Ouest)
 House of Saddam
 Justified
 Kingdom
 Kinky et Cosy
 The Knick
 Misfits
 Outcast
 Plaisir de Nuire, Joie de Décevoir
 Power
 Powers
 Preacher
 Revivre
 The Sopranos (Les Soprano)
 Spartacus: Blood and Sand (Spartacus : Le Sang des gladiateurs)
 Spartacus: Gods of the Arena (Spartacus : Les Dieux de l'arène)
 Spartacus: Vengeance
 Trafics
 The Walking Dead

OCS City (2013-2023)

 1992
 The Art Of Television : Les réalisateurs de séries 
 Atlanta 
 Ballers
 Band of Brothers 
 Being Human (Being Human : La Confrérie de l'étrange, U.K)
 Big Little Lies 
 Blunt Talk
 Breaking Bad
 The Brink
 Boardwalk Empire
 Bored to Death
 Boss
 The Casual Vacancy (Une place à prendre)
 Crashing
 Curb Your Enthusiasm (Larry et son nombril)
 Divorce
 Eastbound & Down (Kenny Powers)
 Episodes
 Entourage 
 Extra Life
 Flesh and Bone
 The Game
 Game of Thrones (Game of Thrones : Le Trône de fer)
 Girls
 Hello Ladies
 High Maintenance
 Irma Vep
 Irresponsable
 In America
 Insecure
 John Adams
 The Knick
 The Leftovers 
 Looking
 Louie
 Low Winter Sun 
 Manhattan
 Masters of Sex
 Missions
 Mozart in the Jungle
 Mr Selfridge
 The Newsroom
 The Night Of
 The Office (U.K)
 Q.I.
 Room 104
 Rome
 Search Party
 Sex and the City
 Sex and the Series
 Show Me a Hero
 Silicon Valley
 Six Feet Under
 The Sopranos (Les Soprano)
 Templeton
 Togetherness
 Transparent
 Treme
 True Blood
 True Detective
 Veep 
 Vice Principals
 Vinyl
 Xanadu
 Westworld
 The White Lotus

OCS Pulp (2023-present) 
 3615 Monique
 Tales of the Walking Dead

References

External links
 Official website
 OCS on Twitter

Television stations in France
Television channels and stations established in 2008
Orange S.A.
Canal+